Youthquake! is a 1976 documentary directed by Max B. Miller. It examines the influence of rock music on religious beliefs. It won the Golden Globe Award for Best Documentary Film at the 33rd Golden Globe Awards.

References

External links

1976 films
1976 documentary films
American documentary films
Rockumentaries
Documentary films about religion
1970s American films